Pseudoparodiella is a genus of fungi in the family Venturiaceae. This is a monotypic genus, containing the single species Pseudoparodiella vernoniae.

References

External links
Pseudoparodiella at Index Fungorum

Venturiaceae
Monotypic Dothideomycetes genera